Voivod is a Canadian heavy metal band from Jonquière, Quebec (now Saguenay, Quebec). The original line-up consisted of vocalist Denis "Snake" Bélanger, guitarist Denis "Piggy" D'Amour, drummer Michel "Away" Langevin and bassist Jean-Yves "Blacky" Thériault. The band has had numerous members changes throughout its -year career, with Langevin as the only consistent member. Their current line-up includes Langevin, Bélanger, Daniel "Chewy" Mongrain (guitar) and Dominic "Rocky" Laroche (bass). Voivod's musical style has changed several times since the band's origin in the early 1980s. Starting out as a speed metal band, Voivod have added a mix of progressive metal and thrash metal to create their own unique metal style. Voivod is also credited as one of the "big four" Canadian thrash metal bands, along with Sacrifice, Razor and Annihilator, and they have been credited for helping pioneer the subgenre of "technical thrash metal".

Since 1982, when it was co-founded by guitarist Denis "Piggy" D'Amour, Voivod have released fifteen studio albums, as well as one EP, one live album, two compilations, seven demos and one DVD featuring a live concert. The band found mainstream success in the late 1980s with their fifth studio album Nothingface (1989), which is Voivod's only album to enter the Billboard 200 charts, peaking at number 114. The band won the "Visionary" award at the 2017 Progressive Music Awards. In 2019, Voivod's fourteenth studio album, The Wake, won the Juno Award for Metal/Hard Music Album of the Year. Voivod's most recent studio album, Synchro Anarchy, was released in February 2022.

History

Early career (1982–1990)

Voivod was formed in 1982 in Jonquière, Quebec. Influenced equally by the new wave of British heavy metal, the burgeoning hardcore punk scene and 1970s progressive rock, Voivod forged a distinctive brand of heavy music that often relied on lyrical themes such as Reagan-era Cold War politics, post-apocalyptic literature and science fiction. Killing Technology (1987) began the band's evolution in earnest, with the character from Voivod's album covers (drawn by drummer Away and named  "Korgull" on 1986's Rrröööaaarrr) significantly being depicted in a spaceship. Drawing more heavily on hardcore punk than metal influences by this point, Voivod began evolving without the aid of increasing speed and storytelling on the following Dimension Hatross. Voivod was one of the first thrash bands from Canada to gain popularity outside of their country's borders, reaching the peak of their global popularity with the 1989 album Nothingface which featured a cover version of Pink Floyd's "Astronomy Domine". Other covers include Pink Floyd's "The Nile Song" on their 1993 album The Outer Limits and "21st Century Schizoid Man" by King Crimson on Phobos. Much of the band's sound comes from guitarist Piggy's use of dissonant chords, usually played in the high register of the guitar, combined with Blacky's bass tone and chords as well, used extensively on Nothingface. Albums like Dimension Hatröss are dominated by unexpected time signatures and both Piggy and Blacky's liberal use of dissonant, unconventional minor chords.

Departures of Blacky and Snake, and Eric Forrest-era (1991–2000)
Two of the four founding members (bassist Jean-Yves Thériault and vocalist Denis Bélanger) left Voivod in the early 1990s. Jean-Yves co-founded The Holy Body Tattoo an avant-garde modern dance company based in Vancouver BC and also wrote extensively all the music for it, as well as other electronic music projects, while Denis Belanger isolated himself and eventually started a new project, Union Made. Meanwhile, the band recorded four albums as a trio in the mid-to-late 1990s with new member Eric Forrest, nicknamed "E-Force", handling both vocals and bass guitar. Forrest was seriously injured in a car accident in Germany in 1998, and that incarnation of Voivod never regained the momentum they lost during his rehabilitation. After Eric Forrest left the band, his insurance company attempted to sue the band for the injuries he sustained in the crash, as he was in the care of the band at the time.

Reunion with Snake, arrival of Jasonic, and death of Piggy (2001–2006)
Voivod briefly disbanded in 2001 before Bélanger returned to the band. The next incarnation of Voivod featured three of the four founding members: Denis Bélanger (a.k.a. "Snake"; vocals), Denis D'Amour ("Piggy"; guitars), and Michel Langevin ("Away"; drums) along with Jason Newsted ("Jasonic", of Metallica) on bass guitar. The album Voivod was released in 2003. Guitarist Denis D'Amour died at the age of 45 on August 26, 2005 due to complications from colon cancer. In July 2006 they released Katorz, based around riffs found on the laptop of D'Amour. Just prior to his death, he left instructions for his bandmates on how to use them. In November 2006, the song "X-Stream" was featured on Guitar Hero II.

Infini, return of Blacky, and Target Earth (2007–2013)

Voivod were planning to work on what was to be their final studio album in late 2007, which contained tracks recorded with D'Amour before his death. Voivod was part of the Heavy MTL show that was held in Montreal on June 22, 2008. Voivod also performed at the Monsters of Rock Festival in Calgary, Alberta, on July 26, 2008, and supported Judas Priest at the Bell Centre in Montreal, on August 12, 2008. Voivod also played a full set at Thrash Domination in Kawasaki, Japan, September 20–21, 2008, along with the bands Testament and Forbidden. The band consisted of Bélanger, Langevin, a returning 'Blacky' Thériault, and Dan Mongrain on guitar.

In early January 2009, Voivod announced that they were putting the finishing touches on their new album and expected to release it in the spring of that year. The album, now known as Infini, was released on June 23, 2009.

By July 2010, Voivod had been writing and recording new music (including Dan Mongrain on guitar). On July 4, 2012, Voivod announced the title of their thirteenth studio album, Target Earth, which was released on January 22, 2013. Target Earth has a more progressive sound than some of their last few albums, and is a return to a more "classic" Voivod sound that can be heard on Dimension Hatross and Nothingface. All the music was written by Blacky and Chewy, while Snake focused on lyrics, and Away took care of the artwork.

Second departure of Blacky and arrival of Dominic "Rocky" Laroche (2014–present)
On July 10, 2014, it was reported that Blacky had left Voivod again. It was announced that he was forced out of the band. In late January 2015 the band released the new single "We Are Connected" which is the lead track from the 7-inch split vinyl disc with the band At the Gates. It is the first music to feature new bassist Dominic "Rocky" Laroche. They also released a new, five-track EP, entitled Post Society, featuring two new tracks and a cover of Hawkwind's "Silver Machine", on February 26, 2016.

As early as February 2015, Voivod began work on their fourteenth studio album, which was to be released in 2016 but later pushed back to 2017. The band was expected to begin recording the album in August 2017. In June 2017, Langevin told Rock Sverige that the songwriting was almost completed with an estimated release for early 2018. He also said that the album would probably be a double-album on vinyl due to the songs being "really long and progressive", describing them as "seven or eight minutes long songs" and with it being a concept album as well. In November 2017, the members of Voivod began recording their next studio album, titled The Wake, which was released in September 2018.

Voivod's fifteenth studio album, Synchro Anarchy, was released on February 11, 2022.

The master tapes for Voivod's MCA-era albums were long thought to have been destroyed in the 2008 Universal Studios fire; this was later disputed by Blacky, who revealed in late 2019 that the master tapes for Nothingface, Angel Rat and The Outer Limits were located in a facility in Pennsylvania, after persistently questioning Universal staff, and claimed that they are now in his possession.

Musical style, influences, and legacy
Voivod's style is classified as progressive metal, thrash metal, technical thrash metal, alternative metal, speed metal and avant-garde metal. Their 1991 album Angel Rat has been labelled alternative metal. Voivod's influences include Béla Bartók, Igor Stravinsky, Dimitri Shostakovich, Yes, Einstürzende Neubauten, GBH, Genesis, Hawkwind, Judas Priest, Iron Maiden, Killing Joke, King Crimson, Motörhead, Sodom, Nektar, Pink Floyd, Ramones, Rush, Van der Graaf Generator, Venom and UFO. The band has been praised for their unique approach by other bands and artists such as Meshuggah, Fear Factory, Jason Newsted (Voivod's bassist for their 2000s albums), and Dave Grohl.

Members

Current
Michel "Away" Langevin – drums (1982–present)
Denis "Snake" Bélanger – vocals (1982–1994, 2001–present)
Daniel "Chewy" Mongrain – guitars (2008–present)
Dominic "Rocky" Laroche – bass (2014–present)

Guest musicians
Pierre St-Jean – bass (1992–1993, on The Outer Limits)
Martin Bolduc – bass (1993–1994)
Gilles Brisebois – bass (1994)
Vincent Peake – bass (2002)

Former
Denis "Piggy" D'Amour – guitars (1982–2005; his death)
Jean-Yves "Blacky" Thériault – bass (1982–1991, 2008–2014)
Eric "E-Force" Forrest – bass, vocals (1994–2001)
Jason "Jasonic" Newsted – bass (2001–2008)

Timeline

Discography

 War and Pain (1984)
 Rrröööaaarrr (1986)
 Killing Technology (1987)
 Dimension Hatröss (1988)
 Nothingface (1989)
 Angel Rat (1991)
 The Outer Limits (1993)
 Negatron (1995)
 Phobos (1997)
 Voivod (2003)
 Katorz (2006)
 Infini (2009)
 Target Earth (2013)
 The Wake (2018)
 Synchro Anarchy (2022)

References

External links

 
 

Canadian speed metal musical groups
Canadian progressive metal musical groups
Canadian thrash metal musical groups
Metal Blade Records artists
Musical groups established in 1982
English-language musical groups from Quebec
Musical quartets
Nuclear Blast artists
Articles which contain graphical timelines
Bands with fictional stage personas
Saguenay, Quebec
1982 establishments in Quebec
Canadian alternative metal musical groups
Juno Award for Heavy Metal Album of the Year winners
Sonic Unyon artists